This article presents a list of the historical events and publications of Australian literature during 1860.

Books 
 Mary Theresa Vidal – Bengala, or, Some Time Ago
 Eliza Winstanley – Margaret Falconer

Short stories 
 Ellen Liston – "Cousin Lucy's Story"

Poetry 

 C. J. Carleton – South Australian Lyrics
 Charles Harpur – "Wellington"
 Basil E. Kendall – "Joys that Are No More"
 Henry Kendall
 "Christmas Morning in the Bush"
 "The Curlew Song"
 John Anthony Moore – Tasmanian Rhymings

Births 

A list, ordered by date of birth (and, if the date is either unspecified or repeated, ordered alphabetically by surname) of births in 1860 of Australian literary figures, authors of written works or literature-related individuals follows, including year of death.

 3 May – Emily Coungeau, poet (died 1936)
 5 August – John Philip Bourke, poet (died 1914)

See also 
 1860 in Australia
 1860 in literature
 1860 in poetry
 List of years in literature
 List of years in Australian literature

References

 
Australia
19th-century Australian literature
Australian literature by year